A sling, also known as arm sling, is a device to limit movement of the shoulder or elbow while it heals. A sling can be created from a triangular bandage.

References

Orthopedics